The 1963 Giro di Lombardia was the 57th edition of the Giro di Lombardia cycle race and was held on 19 October 1963. The race started in Milan and finished in Como. The race was won by Jo de Roo of the Saint-Raphaël team.

General classification

References

1963
Giro di Lombardia
Giro di Lombardia
1963 Super Prestige Pernod